Livonia mammilla, common name false melon or false baler, is a species of sea snail, a marine gastropod mollusk of the genus Livonia in the family Volutidae, the volutes.

Distribution
This marine species occurs off South East Australia from Western Victoria to New South Wales, Southern Queensland and Tasmania.

Description

Whorls are smooth and rounded, with axial growth lines and weak spiral grooves on the top of the body whorl. Columella shows four plaits and the outer lip is smooth and flared outwards. The background colour is yellowish-brown or cream, while the inner edge of outer lip may be white or orange. Body whorl usually has two wide spiral bands of axial zigzag brown lines, but this pattern is variable.

The distinctive patterns on the shell are produced by a process analogous to a linear cellular automaton and can accordingly resemble fractal shapes like the Sierpinski gasket.

Habitat
These moderately common sea snails live in subtidal waters and offshore on sand and mud, at depths of 73 to 457 m., emerging at night to feed.

Bibliography
 A.G. Hinton – Guide to Australian Shells
 Allan, J.K. 1950. Australian Shells: with related animals living in the sea, in freshwater and on the land. Melbourne : Georgian House
 Bail, P & Poppe, G. T. 2001. A conchological iconography: a taxonomic introduction of the recent Volutidae. Hackenheim-Conchbook, 30 pp, 5 pl.
 Barry Wilson – Australian Marine Shells Part 2
 Harald Douté, M. A. Fontana Angioy – Volutes, The Doute collection
 Macpherson, J.H. & Gabriel, C.J. 1962. Marine Molluscs of Victoria. Melbourne : Melbourne University Press & National Museum of Victoria

References

External links
 Encyclopedia of life

Volutidae
Gastropods described in 1844